KEF is a British loudspeaker manufacturer.

KEF may also refer to:
Keflavík International Airport's IATA code

See also
Kef (disambiguation)